Los Lobos del Este de Los Angeles (Just another band from East L.A.) is the debut album by The American band Los Lobos, at the time known as Los Lobos del Este de Los Angeles. It was self-released by the band in early 1978 and features mostly traditional Mexican folk music. The album was recorded live to 16-track and represented the band's live repertoire at the time, which included their original song, "Flor de Huevo", an instrumental written by guitarist David Hidalgo. It was reissued on CD in 2000 by Hollywood Records with one bonus track.

Track listing

Personnel
Los Lobos del Este de Los Angeles
 David Hidalgo – guitar, requinto romantico, requinto jarocho, mandola, tres, cuatro, violin, percussion, lead vocals (5, 11)
 Cesar Rosas – guitar, mandolin, jarana, requinto romantico, lead vocals (1–3, 6–8, 10–12)
 Conrad Lozano – bass, guitarrón, lead vocals (9)
 Louie Pérez – guitar, jarana, charango, vihuela, percussion
Additional musicians
 Charlie Tovar – congas, percussion (3, 9)
Production
 Luis R. Torres – producer 
 David Sandoval – producer, photography 
 Los Lobos del Este de Los Angeles – producer, instrumental arrangements
 Patrick Flynn – engineer 
 Mark Fleisher – engineer, mixing
 Edward W. Randell Jr. – graphics
 Mary Pérez – photography
 Rudy Rodriquez – photography
 Kevin Bartley – remastering (2000 reissue)
 Cesar Rosas – photography, remix (12), remastering (2000 reissue)
 Brian Soucy – remix (12)

Notes 

1978 debut albums
Los Lobos albums